John Holland (3 April 1897–1944) was an English footballer who played in the Football League for Barrow, Carlisle United, Clapton Orient, Crewe Alexandra, Newport County, Preston North End, Swansea Town and Wrexham.

References

1897 births
1944 deaths
English footballers
Association football forwards
English Football League players
Preston North End F.C. players
Swansea City A.F.C. players
Wrexham A.F.C. players
Crewe Alexandra F.C. players
Newport County A.F.C. players
Leyton Orient F.C. players
Carlisle United F.C. players
Barrow A.F.C. players